Shri Shikshayatan College is an undergraduate women's liberal arts college in Kolkata, India. It was founded on 8 July 1955. It is affiliated with the University of Calcutta. It also offers a master's degree in English and Commerce.

Location
11 Lord Sinha road, Kolkata-700071. It also has a school with the same name within its compound.

Courses

GRADUATION

Commerce
B.com (Hons.)
B.com (General)

Arts
B.A. (Hons.) Bengali
B.A. (Hons.) Hindi
B.A. (Hons.) English
B.A. (Hons.) History
B.A. (Hons.) Education
B.A. (Hons.) Political Science
B.A. (Hons.) Philosophy  
B.A. (General)

Science
B.Sc. (Hons.) Botany
B.Sc. (Hons.) Mathematics
B.Sc. (Hons.) Geography
B.Sc. (Hons.) Economics
B.Sc. (Hons.) Chemistry 
B.Sc. (General)

Self Financing
B.A. (Hons.) Journalism and Mass Communication
B.B.A. (Hons.)

Post-Graduation
M.Com.
M.A. (English)
B.Ed

Student Societies
Debate Societies
Nature Societies
Cultural Society (Dance, Drama & Music)
Social Welfare Committee
These are organized and managed by students. Each student must be a member of at least one society.Students are encouraged to participate in environment protection activities under the guidance of teachers.

Events
Srijan:  Inter –college fest organized by the students of the college.
Annual programme: The programme is celebrated along with the Prize Distribution Ceremony for the University Results
Shree: The Annual Art and Cuisine Fair is held in the college building on the last working day prior to the Durga Puja vacation.
Foundation Day: The Foundation Day of the college is celebrated on the 8th of July every year.
Annual Sports: Annual Sports is held on a weekend in the month of December at the Hastings Ground in Alipore.
Rowing: College collaborates with Lake Club to offer rowing facilities to its students.

Notable alumnae
 Mamata Banerjee, Chief Minister of West Bengal
 Usha Ganguly, theatre director
 Trina Saha, actress

References

External links

University of Calcutta affiliates
Universities and colleges in Kolkata
Educational institutions established in 1995
Women's universities and colleges in West Bengal
1955 establishments in West Bengal